Karl Ingold was a record setting pioneer aviator.

Biography
On 7 February 1914 he flew continuously from 7:35 am until 11:55 pm covering 1,056 miles in 16 hours and 20 minutes, besting the previous nonstop record set three days before by Bruno Langer.

See also
Flight distance record

References

German aviators
20th-century German people
Flight distance record holders
German aviation record holders